Emery Price Brookfield (May 11, 1920 – April 17, 2006) was an American professional basketball and baseball player.

Brookfield played college basketball for the West Texas A&M Buffaloes and Iowa State Cyclones. He played professionally for the Indianapolis Jets and Rochester Royals of the Basketball Association of America (BAA)) and National Basketball Association (NBA) for 61 games.

Brookfield also played baseball for the Borger Gassers of the West Texas–New Mexico League as a pitcher in 1942 and 1946.

Brookfield served in the United States Navy during World War II. After his retirement from playing, he coached high school basketball, baseball and golf in Indiana. Brookfield died in his home in Pinehurst, North Carolina.

BAA/NBA career statistics

Regular season

References

External links

NBL statistics

1920 births
2006 deaths
All-American college men's basketball players
American men's basketball players
Baseball pitchers
Baseball players from Texas
Basketball players from Texas
Borger Gassers players
Chicago American Gears players
Forwards (basketball)
Guards (basketball)
Indianapolis Jets players
Iowa State Cyclones men's basketball players
People from Floydada, Texas
Professional Basketball League of America players
Rochester Royals players
West Texas A&M Buffaloes basketball players
United States Navy personnel of World War II